Simplemente Mujer: A 1984 album by Vikki Carr that won a Grammy Award for Best Mexican-American Recording. The album produced a hit single in the song Ni Princesa, Ni Esclava. This was Carr's first recording with mariachi accompaniment. Label: Sony.

Track listing
"Ni Princesa, Ni Esclava"
"Poquito a Poco"
"Ni Me Viene Ni Me Va"
"Paloma Negra"
"Atrapame"
"Nada"
"A Mis Cadenas"
"Si Nos Dejan"
"Amaneci Contigo"
"No'Mas Ocho Dias"

External links
Vikki Carr

1984 albums
Vikki Carr albums
Ranchera albums
Spanish-language albums
Grammy Award for Best Mexican/Mexican-American Album